The Williamsport Bureau of Fire provides fire protection and emergency medical services to the city of Williamsport, Pennsylvania.

History 
Williamsport Bureau of Fire was established in 1874 after a devastating fire that destroyed much of the cities down town in 1871.

In a move to cut the departments budget the bureau formed an alliance with neighboring Old Lycoming Township Volunteer Fire Department on September 19, 1999. The alliance sent two career firefighters to Old Lycoming Township in return the volunteer fire company would make all apparatus (Squad, Tanker, Special Unit, Battalion, Ambulance and Brush) as well as manpower available to the city when needed. This move allowed the bureau to retire five apparatus an engine, tanker and rescue saving the bureau over 2 million in maintenance, training and staffing pay for operating the apparatus. The City of Williamsport and Loyalsock Fire Company also tired an alliance with the city but due to staffing Engine 18-1 was placed Out Of Service.

As of the late 1980s Williamsport Bureau of Fire doesn't operate its own ambulances. It has a contract with Susquehanna Regional EMS.

Stations and apparatus

References 

Fire departments in Pennsylvania
Firefighting in Pennsylvania